Leptospermum deuense is a species of shrub that is endemic to New South Wales. It is a leafy, densely branched shrub with rough bark on the older stems, elliptical leaves with a glossy upper surface, white flowers arranged singly or in pairs and woody fruit.

Description
It has rough bark on the older stems, smooth bark with soft hairs on the younger stems. Flowering mainly occurs in February and the fruit is a woody capsule  in diameter.

Taxonomy
This species was formally described in 1989 by Joy Thompson in the botanical journal Telopea, based on plant material collected from Deua National Park in 1984. The specific epithet (deuense) refers to the collection of the type specimens near the Deua River.

Distribution and habitat
Leptospermum deuense is only known from a small area on mountains in the Deua National Park near Moruya where it grows in scrub or exposed woodland on a rhyolite ridge.

Use in horticulture
It can be propagated by seed or cuttings.

References

deuense
Myrtales of Australia
Flora of New South Wales
Plants described in 1989